The 207th Tactical Fighter Squadron was a squadron of the 7th Air Wing of the Japan Air Self-Defense Force. It was based at Naha Air Base, in Okinawa Prefecture, Japan. It was equipped with Lockheed F-104J/DJ aircraft.

History
The squadron was formed at half strength at Hyakuri Air Base in Ibaraki Prefecture on March 1, 1966. After 18 months it had the required 18 aircraft and in August 1967 it began Quick Reaction Alert flights. These continued until September 1972. Following the return of Okinawa Prefecture to Japanese control in 1972, the squadron relocated to Naha Air Base. In March 1986 it disbanded, the final F-104J unit to do so.

Aircraft operated

Fighter aircraft
 Lockheed F-104J/DJ (1966-1987)

See also
 Fighter units of the Japan Air Self-Defense Force

References

Units of the Japan Air Self-Defense Force